Strafford may refer to:

Places
In the United States:
 Strafford, Missouri, a city
 Strafford, New Hampshire, a town
 Strafford, Pennsylvania
 Strafford, Vermont, a town
 Strafford County, New Hampshire

Other
Thomas Wentworth, 1st Earl of Strafford (1593–1641), politician impeached and executed in 1641 
Earl of Strafford, a title that has been created several times in British history
Stephen Strafford, British air marshal
Strafford (play), written in 1837 by Robert Browning
Strafford Moss, musical theatre tenor

See also
Stafford (disambiguation)
Stratford (disambiguation)